RPM was a Canadian magazine that published the best-performing singles of Canada from 1964 to 2000. In 1986, forty-one songs peaked at number one on the magazine's chart. Lionel Richie's "Say You, Say Me" was the first chart-topper of the year while Bruce Hornsby and the Range stayed at number one into 1987 with "The Way It Is". Only twelve musical acts had peaked at number one in Canada before this year: Lionel Richie, Corey Hart, Billy Ocean, Mr. Mister, Starship, Madonna, George Michael, Huey Lewis and the News, Cyndi Lauper, The Human League, and Elton John and Stevie Wonder (credited as "Friends" on "That's What Friends Are For").

Two Canadian acts—Corey Hart and Glass Tiger—reached number one during 1986, and four singers peaked atop the chart with multiple singles: Whitney Houston, Billy Ocean, Madonna, and Peter Cetera. Of these four, Madonna attained both the most number-one hits (three) and the highest total of weeks at number one (five). Cetera spent three weeks at number one while Houston and Ocean each topped the chart for two weeks. The best-performing record of the year was "The Power of Love" by American singer Jennifer Rush, which topped the listing on the issues of 29 April and 3 May. Besides Houston, Ocean, and Rush, the other acts that peaked atop the magazine's chart for more than one week were Lionel Richie, Mr. Mister, Glass Tiger, Patti LaBelle, Michael McDonald, Peter Gabriel, Timex Social Club, and Chris de Burgh.

Chart history

Notes

See also
1986 in music
List of number-one albums of 1986 (Canada)
List of Billboard Hot 100 number-one singles of 1986
List of Cash Box Top 100 number-one singles of 1986

References

External links
 Read about RPM Magazine at the AV Trust
 Search RPM charts here at Library and Archives Canada

 
1986 record charts
1986